Associazione Sportiva Dilettantistica Sangiovannese 1927 (formerly Associazione Calcio Sangiovannese 1927) is an Italian association football club based in San Giovanni Valdarno, Tuscany. They currently play in Serie D.

History

Sangiovannese 1927 

The club was founded in 1927 as A.C. Sangiovannese 1927.

Sangiovannese played in Serie C2 from 2000–01, following their promotion from Serie D, then reaching Serie C1 in 2003–04. The club played in this league until 2007–08 when they were relegated to Lega Pro Seconda Divisione. Sangio would remain in this division for three seasons until 2010–11.

They did not compete in the league during the 2011–12 Lega Pro Seconda Divisione season.

SanGiovanniValdarno 
The club was refounded in 2011 as A.S.D. SanGiovanniValdarno.

In the 2013–14 season, they were promoted to Serie D after winning the play-out.

Colours and badge
The team's colours are blue and white.

Players

Honours

Serie D:
 Winners 1: 1999–2000
Scudetto Dilettanti:
 Winners 1: 1999–2000

References

External links
Site of team's news

Football clubs in Tuscany
Association football clubs established in 1927
Serie C clubs
1927 establishments in Italy